Peter Tanev (born 1968) is a Danish weather presenter who has been presenting weather forecasts for TV 2 since 1996. He has a bachelor's degree in climatology from the University of Copenhagen.

Tanev's father was Bulgarian and he was raised as a Catholic.

In addition to his work on television, Tanev also lectures about the weather, climate and the environment and has published two books.

References

1968 births
Living people
Television meteorologists
Danish television personalities
University of Copenhagen alumni
Danish people of Bulgarian descent